Richard Ennis Young (June 3, 1928 – January 7, 2018) was a professional baseball player. He played parts of two seasons in Major League Baseball for the Philadelphia Phillies for two seasons, primarily as a second baseman. He played 15 games for the Phillies during the 1951 Philadelphia Phillies season and five games during the 1952 Philadelphia Phillies season.

Young died January 7, 2018.

References

External links

Major League Baseball second basemen
Philadelphia Phillies players
Klamath Falls Gems players
Bradford Blue Wings players
Terre Haute Phillies players
Wilmington Blue Rocks (1940–1952) players
Schenectady Blue Jays players
Baltimore Orioles (IL) players
Birmingham Barons players
Louisville Colonels (minor league) players
Charleston Senators players
Montreal Royals players
Mobile Bears players
Portland Beavers players
Tecolotes de Nuevo Laredo players
St. Paul Saints (AA) players
Spokane Indians players
Chattanooga Lookouts players
Baseball players from Seattle
1928 births
2018 deaths
Washington Huskies baseball players
American expatriate baseball players in Mexico